There were two United States House of Representatives special elections in Hawaii's 2nd congressional district within 35 days of each other to select the successor to Democrat Patsy Mink who had died from pneumonia.  The elections, held November 30, 2002, and January 4, 2003, were officially nonpartisan and each held as general elections without primaries to pick a successor for the remainder of her term in the 107th Congress and for the next term in the 108th Congress, to which Mink was posthumously re-elected.  Both elections were won by Democrat Ed Case.

Background
On August 30, 2002, Mink was hospitalized in Honolulu's Straub Clinic and Hospital with complications from chickenpox. Her condition steadily worsened, and on September 28, 2002, Mink died in Honolulu of viral pneumonia. The week prior to her untimely death, she had won renomination. By this point, it was too late to remove her name from the general election ballot. On November 5, 2002, Mink was posthumously re-elected over state Representative Bob McDermott (R). As a result, this triggered two separate special elections: the first to fill the vacancy during the end of the 107th Congress and the second for the new term beginning on January 3, 2003. In accordance with Hawaiian law the elections were single nonpartisan races without primaries.

Election to the 107th Congress (November 30, 2002) 
The two most notable candidates to compete in the first election were then-state representative and former state House Majority Leader Ed Case and John Mink, the former husband of the late Congresswoman. Despite the latter's connections to the district's prior representative, Case would win the election with fifty-one percent of the vote.

Election to the 108th Congress (January 4, 2003) 
The now-freshman incumbent Case immediately ran for reelection in the early January 2003 race for the second district seat in the 108th Congress, going up against more than three dozen other candidates. Other Democrats included state Senators Matt Matsunaga and Colleen Hanabusa. Republicans included state Representatives Barbara Marumoto and Bob C. McDermott, and former Honolulu Mayor Frank Fasi. Case won this election with 43 percent of the vote.

References

2002-2003 02 special
Hawaii 2002-2003 02

Hawaii 02 special
Hawaii 02
United States House of Representatives 02 special

Hawaii 02 special
Hawaii 02
United States House of Representatives 02 special

United States House of Representatives 2002-2003 02